Aurora Mountain is located in the Blue Range of the Canadian Rockies, which forms part of the Continental Divide and the provincial boundary between British Columbia and Alberta. It is named after , a British Royal Navy light cruiser launched in 1913 that was transferred to the Royal Canadian Navy in 1920.

See also
List of mountains of Alberta
Mountains of British Columbia
List of peaks on the Alberta–British Columbia border

References

Two-thousanders of Alberta
Two-thousanders of British Columbia
Alberta's Rockies
Great Divide of North America
Borders of Alberta
Borders of British Columbia